Mont is a surname. Notable people with the surname include:

 Christopher Mont, 16th-century English diplomat
 Fiona Mont (born 1970), British fugitive wanted for questioning about computer fraud
 Mia Mont (born 1989), Peruvian singer-songwriter
 Tommy Mont (1922–2012), American educator, university administrator, college football coach, and National Football League quarterback

See also
 Jordy Mont-Reynaud (born 1983), American chess player
 Fernando Gómez Mont (born 1963), Mexican lawyer and politician